Bosnia and Herzegovina Women's Premier League (Bosnian/Croatian, Serbian: Ženska Premijer Liga BiH) is the top level women's football league of Bosnia and Herzegovina. Since 2013 the league has been unified. Before it was played in two separate groups based on league systems confined within Bosnia's entities, one being the First Women's League of the Federation of Bosnia and Herzegovina and the other First Women's League of the Republika Srpska, with the champion being decided through play-offs. 

The winner of the play-off qualifies for a spot in the UEFA Women's Champions League.

The league draws little media attention in Bosnia and Herzegovina, while the funding is often inadequate and clubs lack infrastructure, in some cases even basic training facilities.

History
Until 2013 the league was divided into the NFSBiH league and the league of the Republic of Srpska. The best two teams of the NFSBiH league qualified for a play-off in which the champion of the Republika Srpska women's football championship joined. The venue for the play-off was decided beforehand and it was played as three-team group.

Format
The teams play a double round robin after which the two best-placed teams advance to 3 team play-off group with the best placed club from Republika Srpska.

In 2014/15 eight teams play a triple round-robin for 21 matches in total.

2020–21 Teams
The 2020–21season is played by the following Eight teams.

List of champions 
The list of champions
 2001–02: NK Iskra Bugojno 
 2002–03: SFK 2000 
 2003–04: SFK 2000 
 2004–05: SFK 2000
 2005–06: SFK 2000 
 2006–07: SFK 2000 
 2007–08: SFK 2000 
 2008–09: SFK 2000 
 2009–10: SFK 2000 
 2010–11: SFK 2000 
 2011–12: SFK 2000
 2012–13: SFK 2000 
 2013–14: SFK 2000
 2014–15: SFK 2000 
 2015–16: SFK 2000
 2016–17: SFK 2000
2017–18: SFK 2000
2018–19: SFK 2000
2019–20: SFK 2000
2020–21: SFK 2000
2021–22: SFK 2000

Titles by team

References

External links
Official Site of the Football Association of Bosnia and Herzegovina

Top level women's association football leagues in Europe
1
Women
Women's sports leagues in Bosnia and Herzegovina